Anarsia albibasella is a moth of the family Gelechiidae. It was described by Anthonie Johannes Theodorus Janse in 1963. It is found in Namibia.

References

albibasella
Moths described in 1963
Moths of Africa